Daqing West railway station is a railway station of the Harbin–Qiqihar Intercity Railway. It is located in Ranghulu District, Daqing, in the Heilongjiang province of China.

See also

Chinese Eastern Railway

References

Railway stations in Heilongjiang
Daqing
Stations on the Harbin–Qiqihar Intercity Railway